Marayniyuq (Quechua maran, maray batan or grindstone, maray to tear down, to knock down, -ni, -yuq suffixes, "the one with the grind stone", also spelled Marayniyoc) is a mountain in the Cordillera Central in the Andes of Peru which reaches a height of approximately . It is located in the Lima Region, Yauyos Province, Huancaya District.

References 

Mountains of Peru
Mountains of Lima Region